Kittie Brighton, sometimes written as Kitty Brighton, was a state legislator in Colorado and a member of the Democratic Party. She served with some of the other women who were elected to the state legislature in Colorado.

She, Helen Beatty Noland and Annah G. Pettee sponsored a bill to allow physicians to provide information on birth control.

She was elected to serve in the Colorado House of Representatives representing Las Animas County and served from 1927 until 1932.

References

Members of the Colorado House of Representatives

Year of birth missing (living people)
Living people